Beaussais-sur-Mer is a commune in the department of Côtes-d'Armor, western France. The municipality was established on 1 January 2017 by merger of the former communes of Ploubalay (the seat), Plessix-Balisson and Trégon.

Population

See also 
Communes of the Côtes-d'Armor department

References

External links

 

Communes of Côtes-d'Armor

Communes nouvelles of Côtes-d'Armor
Populated places established in 2017
2017 establishments in France